Impact Confections is a candy company founded in 1981. Impact Confections is a U.S. based manufacturer of candies marketed under the WARHEADS and Melster Candies Brands. WARHEADS is a brand of sour candies. Melster Candies, established in 1919, is a brand of marshmallow candies. Most of Impact Confections' branded and co-manufactured candies are produced in their SQF Certified facility in Janesville, Wisconsin. It is owned by private equity firm Mill City Capital.

Products

Warheads 

Warheads - Impact's flagship brand - are a brand of sour confectionery in five fruit flavors, as they come in different varieties.

Current Impact Confections products
 WARHEADS Extreme Sour Hard Candy 
 WARHEADS Chewy Cubes
 WARHEADS Worms
 WARHEADS SMASHUPS Extreme Sour Hard Candy
 WARHEADS Sour Twists
 WARHEADS Sour Taffy
 WARHEADS Dippin' Ring
 Melster Circus Peanuts
 Melster Peanut Butter Kisse

References

External links 
 

Confectionery companies of the United States
Companies based in Colorado Springs, Colorado
Companies established in 1981